Eddy Navía Dalence  (born 6 September 1949) is a Bolivian composer, musician and Charango virtuoso.

Biography 
Two time Latin Grammy nominee Eddy Navia was born in Potosí, Bolivia. He began his musical career in the 1960s, forming the group "Los Rebeldes," which played contemporary popular music including pieces by the Ventures. After his studies took him outside Bolivia, he began performing on the charango and became a virtuoso of the instrument. Navia first recorded with the guitarist Gerardo Arias, and in 1970 he recorded three albums with Julio Cesar Paredes

In 1975 Navia co-founded the legendary group Savia Andina with Alcides Mejia, Oscar Castro, Julio Cesar Paredes and later Gerardo Arias. They included works by the great masters on indigenous instruments and above all performed Bolivian music. Eddy composed beloved works such as "Tinkuna", "Copagira", "Tacuaral", "Summit", "Dance of the Sicuri" and the recordings of Savia Andina hit the top forties chart in South America. He was the first charanguist who interpreted works of the great composers of classical music in the self-titled album Savia Andina released in 1978. The group toured the world playing in Paris, Russia, Japan, Tahiti, and Australia.

In 1989, Navia left Savia Andina to come to the United States, and became the Artistic Director of the Group Sukay, who has performed for 40 years internationally. Eddy has seven solo albums, 35 recordings on Savia Andina and 30 more on the Sukay World Music label.  He currently resides in San Francisco, California and co-founded with his wife of 32 years, Quentin Navia, the Peña Pachamama Center ('Pachamama' means 'Mother Earth' in quechua) which is still open for more than 21 years. He continues to perform music with his wife Quentin, who co-founded SUKAY in 1974, and son Gabriel Navia.

Awards 
Quentin and Eddy created a recording and publishing company producing 29 more recordings available at CD Baby, Amazon, and iTunes. The latest of these recording were Grammy nominees. Eddy Navia was nominated two times for a Latin Grammy for his albums of folk music "Piano and Charango" and "Carnaval in Piano Charango" recorded together with Cuban Chuchito Valdés in 2012 and 2013.

External links
"Artículo publicado en el diario boliviano La Razón"

1949 births
Living people
Bolivian composers
Bolivian male musicians
Male composers